Harriet the Spy: Blog Wars is a 2010 television film starring Jennifer Stone that premiered on March 19, 2010 on Movie Central and The Movie Network in Canada, and on March 26, 2010, on Disney Channel in the United States. It is an adaptation of the book Harriet the Spy, by Louise Fitzhugh, the second after the 1996 Harriet the Spy film that starred Michelle Trachtenberg as Harriet. The film was produced by 9 Story Entertainment. Vanessa Morgan, who starred as Marion in the movie, went on to star in My Babysitter's a Vampire and its subsequent television series, which also aired on Disney Channel.

The film centers on Harriet M. Welsch (Jennifer Stone), an 11-year-old in the book, changed to a teenager for the film. Jennifer Stone told Popstar magazine, "We're basing it off the charm of the first book. They aged Harriet up to 16, and it still deals with mean girls, except it matures that a little. It's a bit more of mean girls having to do with gossip and heartthrobs and all that. The first book was written in the 60's so we're trying to bring it up to 2010. We're putting our own spin on it."

It is the first Disney Channel film since 1997 that was not promoted as a "Disney Channel Original Movie" and the first released through 9 Story Entertainment. It was co-produced in association with Disney Channel and Canadian pay TV channels Movie Central and The Movie Network. However, according to the Disney Channel website, the film is listed as a Disney Channel Original Movie.

Plot
Young spy Harriet M. Welsch (Jennifer Stone) crosses paths with popular student Marion Hawthorne (Vanessa Morgan), as the two girls compete to become the official blogger of their high school class. After Marion has started blogging, Harriet lags behind because she reports what she finds interesting. Unfortunately for Harriet, her classmates do not share her views and state that her blog is boring. Harriet's nanny, Golly, suggests that she write something is of interest to both Harriet and her classmates.

Harriet sets her sights on a big pop star, Skander Hill (Wesley Morgan), who is in town starring in a movie, Spy Teen 2: The Sequel, that her father, Roger Welsch (Doug Murray), is producing. However, Violetta Welsch (Shauna MacDonald) claims that Harriet has a crush on Skander. Despite her disdain for the star of the film, Harriet starts blogging about Skander Hill. First, she goes to stalk him by doing a father/daughter visit, but Skander has an outburst and Harriet is forced off of the set.

When Harriet goes to the hotel where Skander is staying, she finds him arguing with other producers of the movie. When he switches shirts, Harriet notices a birth-mark on him and takes a picture, also stealing a water bottle. It only makes the other students love him more. Marion and her friends invite Harriet over and watch "Spy Teen". She lies and runs downstairs to talk to Skander. However, it is Sport pretending to be Skander. The posse gets excited, but Marion's still suspicious.

The next time Harriet goes to the hotel, she disguises herself as a maid and steals a hotel receipt signed by Skander, but Skander notices her, and she runs away. She shows Marion the signature, but Marion claims it is a forgery. Skander spots Harriet stalking him and follows her to Janie's house. Meanwhile, Harriet's friends decide to cut off their friendship with her because she is too obsessed with Skander. They feel left out and claim that Harriet is befriending the people whom she once despised. While leaving, Harriet bumps into a chemical made by her eco-friend. This causes a loud noise to emanate from Janie's room, which Skander believes to be someone trying to blow him up.

Back at the set, Skander accidentally starts a food fight, which Harriet tries to record, but she notices her father and does not record. When she follows her nanny Golly, she deduces she has a boyfriend. After a long argument, Harriet figures out that Golly is leaving, which causes an uproar in the family. Marion asks Harriet for real proof. Harriet goes back to the set and is put in as an extra, and later Skander comes up to her and devotes his anger to her, while she was recording.

Soon after, she puts the rant on her blog, which Marion puts on the web. Skander quits the movie because he realizes Roger's daughter is the spy. Harriet soon gets back with her friends, and Sport makes a basket. Harriet gives Skander a heartfelt apology, but Skander still quits because he wanted her to stop her blog, but Roger will not allow that, as he believes Harriet is an avid writer. Then Skander gets a major role in another movie. He hugs Harriet and kisses her on the cheek, and then he rejoins the movie, returning everything to normal.

Harriet gets the blog (while Marion loses because she violated the rules to publicize Skander's rant), and at the end, magazines show a possible relationship between Skander and Harriet.

Cast
 Jennifer Stone as Harriet M. Welsch
 Alexander Conti as Simon "Sport" Rocque
 Melinda Shankar as Janie Gibbs
 Jayne Eastwood as Ms. Elson
 Shauna MacDonald as Violetta Welsch
 Wesley Morgan as Skander Hill
 Vanessa Morgan as Marion Hawthorne
 Doug Murray as Roger Welsch
 Aislinn Paul as Beth Ellen Hansen
 Kiana Madeira as Rachel Lewis
 Kristin Booth as Katherine "Ole Golly"

International releases

References

External links
 

2010 television films
2010 films
2010s high school films
2010s teen comedy films
American high school films
American spy comedy films
American teen comedy films
American comedy television films
Canadian teen comedy films
Canadian comedy television films
Films based on American novels
Films set in New York City
Films shot in Toronto
2010s spy comedy films
Spy television films
Films directed by Ron Oliver
English-language Canadian films
2010s American films
2010s Canadian films